"Sayonara Sensation" is the second single by Hey! Say! JUMP's sub group, Sensations, and the group's eighteenth single overall. It was released for the film Assassination Classroom: Graduation, starring group member Ryosuke Yamada. The group made two music videos for the single: New Gear Mode and Final Battle Mode.

Regular Edition
DVD
 New Gear Mode PV
 Cathode Side PV Making
 Final Battle Mode & New Gear Mode PV & Cathode Side PV Making

Limited Edition
CD
 "Sayonara Sensation"
 "Sayonara Sensation" (Original Karaoke)

DVD
 Final Battle Mode PV
 Anode Side PV
 Final Battle Mode PV & Anode Side PV Making

References

2016 singles
Hey! Say! JUMP songs
2016 songs
J Storm singles